is a 2010 Japanese film based on the novel of the same name by Shinobu Gotoh. It is directed by Kenji Yokoi.

Plot

Kanemitsu Shingyoji (Taiki Naito) first met Arata Misu (Ryōma Baba) when he took the school entrance examination at Shidou High School two years ago and fell in love with Misu at first sight. Although they are a couple now, Shingyoji seems to be the only one who expresses his love for Misu while Misu always treats Shingyoji coldly. When a senpai of Misu, Takahiro Sagara (Yusuke Irose), appears, it becomes a problem between them. Feeling dejected, Shingyoji moves further away from his boyfriend. Can Takumi Hayama (Kyousuke Hamao) and Giichi "Gui" Saki (Daisuke Watanabe) help the lovers?

At the same time, problem also arises between the relationship of Izumi Takabayashi (Ryo Mitsuya) and Michio Yoshizawa (Yutaka Kobayashi) when both are unable to express what they truly feel. When Yoshizawa finds that Takabayashi goes to Gui, he misunderstands him and becomes jealous.

Cast
Ryōma Baba as Arata Misu
Taiki Naito as Kanemitsu Shingyoji
Kyousuke Hamao as Takumi Hayama
Daisuke Watanabe as Giichi "Gui" Saki
Ryo Mitsuya as Izumi Takabayashi
Yutaka Kobayashi as Michio Yoshizawa
Yusuke Irose as Takahiro Sagara
Yukihiro Takiguchi as Shōzō Aikaike

References

External links
Official web site

2010 films
Boys' love films
Films based on Japanese novels
Films set in Japan
2010s Japanese-language films
Gay-related films
Japanese LGBT-related films
2010 LGBT-related films
2010 romantic drama films
LGBT-related romantic drama films
2010s Japanese films